Axel Olof Freudenthal (12 December 1836 – 2 June 1911), was a Swedish-speaking Finnish philologist and politician.

He was born in Siuntio, and studied at the University of Helsinki where the nationalistic movement struggle between the Fennomans and the Svecomans was raging. He was a strong proponent of the use of Swedish in Finland, and subsequently established the theory that the Swedish-speaking population constituted a separate nationality. This theory strongly opposed any form of Finnicization, which it regarded as turning away from Western civilization, and even as a form of Russification. In its more extreme aspects, his theory connected language, nationality and race in a way that claimed supremacy of Swedes over Finns in a way that parallelled other contemporary theories of Aryan supremacy.

Freudenthal was appointed a docent in 1866 in Old Norse language and wrote his doctoral thesis on the dialect of Närpes in 1878. He was a Professor of Swedish language and literature between 1878–1904.  He died in Helsinki. 
His life's work was documented by Arvid Mörne in the book Axel Olof Freudenthal och den finlandssvenska nationalitetstanken (1927).

The Swedish People's Party in Finland considers Freudenthal to be their spiritual father, and it issues an award named after him, the Axel Olof Freudenthal Medal. Many Silver and Bronze medals have been given to individuals since 1937, but only one Gold medal has been issued - to Elisabeth Rehn in 1994. However, the party has not issued the medal since 2007 due to external criticism of Freudenthal's racial views. To date, no Freudenthal Medal recipient has renounced the award.

References

External links
 Axel Olof Freudenthal in 375 humanists 23.03.2015, Faculty of Arts, University of Helsinki

1836 births
1911 deaths
People from Siuntio
People from Uusimaa Province (Grand Duchy of Finland)
Swedish-speaking Finns
Finnish people of German descent
Academic staff of the University of Helsinki